John Allen Galbraith (August 23, 1923 – December 21, 2021) was an American politician who served as a member of the Ohio House of Representatives. Galbraith died in Maumee, Ohio on December 21, 2021, at the age of 98.

References

1923 births
2021 deaths
Republican Party members of the Ohio House of Representatives
Politicians from Toledo, Ohio